Hoshyar Mahmud Mohammed Zebari, also simply known as Hoshyar Zebari (also spelled Hoshyar Zebari/Zibari, Kurdish: Hişyar Zêbarî; born 23 September 1953) is an Iraqi politician who formerly served as the Deputy Prime Minister of Iraq in 2014 and also as the Minister of Finance until 2016. He was Minister of Foreign Affairs from 2003 until 2014.

Biography

Zebari was born to a Kurdish family in Aqrah, a city of Duhok Governorate, Iraq and grew up in Mosul. He earned a Bachelor of Arts in Sociology from The University of Jordan in 1976. He also earned a Master of Arts in Sociology of Development from the University of Essex, United Kingdom in 1980. While studying in United Kingdom, he led the Kurdish Students Society in Europe and also served as the chairman of the Overseas Student Committee from 1978 to 1980.

He joined the Kurdistan Democratic Party in 1979. In the 1980s, he fought as a member of the Peshmerga against the Iraqi government under Saddam Hussein. He went on to become a member of KDP's Central Committee as well as its Political Bureau. In 1988, he was given the charge of its foreign relations and represented the party in United States of America and United Kingdom. In 1992, he was appointed as a member of the executive committee of the Iraqi National Congress, as well as its Presidential Council in 1999.

After the 2003 invasion of Iraq, he was appointed as a member of the Iraqi Governing Council. He was appointed Foreign Minister of Iraq in September 2003. In July 2012, Zebari said that al-Qaeda in Iraq members went to Syria, where the militants previously received support and weapons.

On 11 July 2014, Zebari was replaced as foreign minister by Hussain al-Shahristani, Iraq's deputy prime minister, who assumed the position in an acting capacity, after Kurdish politicians withdrew from the government of Prime Minister Nouri al-Maliki. On 8 September 2014, he was appointed as a Deputy Prime Minister of Iraq under the government of the new Prime Minister Haider al-Abadi.

On 18 October 2014, he was appointed as the Minister of Finance of Iraq while Rowsch Shaways was appointed as the new Deputy Prime Minister in his place. On 21 September 2016, he was dismissed from his position as Finance Minister after losing a no-confidence motion over allegations of corruption.

Iraqi politicians and officials called on the government in October 2017 to investigate Zebari for nepotism, after it was revealed that he had appointed his wife and seven of her family members to embassies of Iraq in various European countries.

Zebari tried to participate as a candidate in the presidential elections in 2022, but was banned by the Federal Supreme Court of Iraq over corruption allegations against him dating back to 2016. He protested the decision, stating that no court had convicted him.

Personal life

Zebari is an Iraqi Kurd and a Sunni Muslim. His father was Mahmoud Agha al-Zebari, the chief of the al-Zebari clan, who was assassinated by the Iraqi Intelligence Service in 1981. Three of his older brothers were also killed by Saddam Hussein's regime. His family currently consists of three younger brothers and two younger sisters. He is also the uncle of Massoud Barzani, the former President of Iraqi Kurdistan. His late sister Hamael Mahmoud Agha Zebari had married Mustafa Barzani and gave birth to Massoud. He holds dual citizenship, being a citizen of both Iraq and United Kingdom.

Zebari has married twice. His second wife is Hana Abdul-Sattar al-Dulaimi, the daughter of Abdul-Sattar al-Dulaimi, who was an advisor of Saddam Hussein. His first wife was born in Amedi.

References

External links

Richard Haass meets Hoshyar Zebari, Council on Foreign Relations (CFR), June 8, 2004
Iraq's Foreign Minister Confirms Support for New US Strategy, VOA, January 14, 2007

Members of the Council of Representatives of Iraq
Government ministers of Iraq
1953 births
Living people
Alumni of the University of Essex
Kurdistan Democratic Party politicians
Iraqi Kurdish people
Foreign ministers of Iraq
Finance ministers of Iraq
Kurdish Sunni Muslims
Iraqi Sunni Muslims